The 2020–21 Gardner–Webb Runnin' Bulldogs men's basketball team represented Gardner–Webb University in the 2020–21 NCAA Division I men's basketball season. The Runnin' Bulldogs, led by eighth-year head coach Tim Craft, played their home games at the Paul Porter Arena in Boiling Springs, North Carolina as members of the Big South Conference.

Previous season
The Runnin' Bulldogs finished the 2019–20 season 16–16, 11–7 in Big South play to finish in third place. They defeated UNC Asheville in the quarterfinals of the Big South tournament before losing in the semifinals to Winthrop.

Roster

Schedule and results

|-
!colspan=12 style=| Non-conference regular season

|-
!colspan=9 style=| Big South Conference regular season

|-
!colspan=12 style=| Big South tournament
|-

Source

References

Gardner–Webb Runnin' Bulldogs men's basketball seasons
Gardner-Webb Runnin' Bulldogs
Gardner-Webb Runnin' Bulldogs men's basketball
Gardner-Webb Runnin' Bulldogs men's basketball